William Forrester (16 March 1855 – 23 October 1926) was a Liberal party and Laurier Liberals member of the House of Commons of Canada. He was born in St. Marys, Canada West and became a farmer and manufacturer.

He was first elected to Parliament at the Perth South riding in the 1921 general election after an unsuccessful campaign there in the 1917 election as a Laurier Liberal. After serving his only federal term, the 14th Canadian Parliament, Forrester left the House of Commons and did not seek another term in the 1925 election.

External links
 

1855 births
1926 deaths
Canadian farmers
Liberal Party of Canada MPs
Members of the House of Commons of Canada from Ontario
People from Perth County, Ontario